The Unknown Policeman (Spanish: El gendarme desconocido) is a 1941 Mexican comedy film directed by Miguel M. Delgado and starring Cantinflas, Mapy Cortés, Daniel "Chino" Herrera and Gloria Marín. The film's sets were designed by the art director Jorge Fernandez.

Cast
 Cantinflas as Agente 777 
 Mapy Cortés as La criollita 
 Daniel "Chino" Herrera as Comandante Bravo 
 Gloria Marín as Amparo  
 Julio Villarreal as Jefe de policía  
 Agustín Isunza as Sargento  
 Carlos López Moctezuma as Matias Luis Riquelme  
 Luis G. Barreiro as Empleado hotel  
 Consuelo Guerrero de Luna as doña Joaquinita  
 Carolina Barret as Cabaretera  
 Amparo Arozamena as Esposa de enfermo  
 Estanislao Schillinsky as Gerente hotel  
 Alfredo Varela as Bermúdez 
 Eduardo Arozamena 
 Alfonso Bedoya as Greñas  
 Narciso Busquets as Niño  
 Enrique Carrillo as Borracho en comisaria  
 Roberto Cañedo as Extra 
 Roberto Corell as Cliente Francés de hotel  
 Joaquín Coss as Professor Melo 
 Fernando Curiel as Empleado hotel  
 Manuel Dondé as Amigo vagabundo  
 Rafael Hernández
 Alfonso Jiménez
 Max Langler as Policía  
 Amanda del Llano as Chica restaurante de hotel  
 Rubén Márquez as Hombre bailando hotel  
 Óscar Pulido 
 Humberto Rodríguez as Vendedor de plumas  
 Arturo Soto Rangel as Doctor

References

Bibliography 
 Peter Standish & Steven M. Bell. Culture and Customs of Mexico. Greenwood Publishing Group, 2004.

External links 
 

1941 films
1941 comedy films
Mexican comedy films
1940s Spanish-language films
Films directed by Miguel M. Delgado
Mexican black-and-white films
1940s Mexican films